Gisela Dulko and Edina Gallovits-Hall were the defending champions, but Dulko decided to not participate.
As a result, Gallovits-Hall played with Anabel Medina Garrigues and they won this tournament, by defeating Sharon Fichman and Laura Pous Tió 2–6, 7–6(6), [11–9].

Seeds

Draw

Draw

External links
 Main Draw

Copa Sony Ericsson Colsanitas - Doubles
2011 Doubles